William Day (27 December 1936 – 21 January 2018) was a former footballer who played for Middlesbrough and Newcastle United. He was part of the Boro attack which included Brian Clough and Alan Peacock. Whilst undertaking his national service in Germany, the club used to fly him home of the morning of match days and back again after matches. As an outside right, he wasn't a prolific goalscorer but he created many goals for his teammates.

Following his retirement, he became a bookmaker and could be seen at racecourses in the north of England.

References 

1936 births
Living people
Footballers from Middlesbrough
Association football wingers
English footballers
Middlesbrough F.C. players
Newcastle United F.C. players
Peterborough United F.C. players
English Football League players